In mathematics, Clausen's formula, found by , expresses the square of a Gaussian hypergeometric series as a generalized hypergeometric series. It states

In particular it gives conditions for a hypergeometric series to be positive. This can be used to prove
several inequalities, such as the Askey–Gasper inequality used in the proof of de Branges's theorem.

References

 For a detailed proof of Clausen's formula: 

Special functions